Zhengzhou–Kaifeng intercity railway, abbreviated as the Zhengkai intercity railway, is a higher-speed intercity railway in Henan, China, connecting Zhengzhou and Kaifeng. It is part of the larger Central Plain Metropolitan Intercity Rail network. Construction commenced on December 29, 2009. Some trains through operate to Zhengzhou Xinzheng Airport via the Zhengji ICR or to Jiaozuo via the Zhengjiao ICR.

The Zhengzhou East - Songchenglu section commenced operation on 28 December 2014. The phase II project (Songchenglu - Kaifeng section) is under construction.

Route

Phase I
The first phase is from Zhengzhou East railway station to Songchenglu, via Jialuhe, Lüboyuan and Yulianghe. 

On 10 January 2016, Jialuhe station and Yulianghe station were closed due to lack of passengers. The re-opening date was not given.

Phase II
The phase II project will extend the line to Kaifeng railway station from Songchenglu. Construction started on June 20, 2022.

Future Development
Seven more stations along the line are in the future plan, including Zhongyixueyuan, Dayouzhuang, Yuantangshu, Dameng, Dangzhuang, Cangzhai and Bianxi.

Rolling stock

The railway is using CRH6A intercity EMUs for service, starting from Feb. 2018. Prior to that, CRH2A EMUs were operated.

Fare
At initial operation stage, the fare was 28 yuan for first-class and 18 yuan for second-class over the whole trip. 

After Feb. 2018, with the use of new CRH6A EMUs, fixed seat numbers have been cancelled, as well as the first class seats. The fare is 18 yuan for a ticket.

The elderly, children and disabled soldiers enjoy a 30% discount.

From 28 April 2018, there will be a discount fare for the trains on this railway.

References

High-speed railway lines in China
Rail transport in Henan
25 kV AC railway electrification